Loxostege frustalis is a moth in the family Crambidae. It was described by Zeller in 1852. It is found in Botswana, Kenya, Lesotho, Namibia, South Africa (KwaZulu-Natal, the Eastern Cape and Gauteng) and Zimbabwe.

References

Moths described in 1852
Pyraustinae